The Corsair (1814) is a long tale in verse written by Lord Byron (see 1814 in poetry) and published by John Murray in London. It was extremely popular, selling ten thousand copies on its first day of sale, and was influential throughout the following century, inspiring operas, music and ballet. The 180-page work was dedicated to Irish poet Thomas Moore.

Background
The poetry, divided into cantos (like Dante's Divine Comedy), narrates the story of the corsair or privateer Conrad. It says that in his youth he was rejected by society because of his acts and his later war against humanity (excepting women). In this 180-page tale, the figure of the Byronic hero emerges, "that man of loneliness and mystery", who perceives himself a "villain", an anti-hero.

The long poem was adapted for or inspired numerous other works in a variety of genres: the grand opera The Pacha's Bridal (1836), with music by Francis Romer and a libretto by Mark Lemon; the opera Il corsaro (1848) by Giuseppe Verdi; the overture Le Corsaire (1845) by Hector Berlioz; and the ballet Le Corsaire (1856) by Adolphe Adam. Edward Elgar composed the song "Deep in My Soul" in 1908 with lines from "The Corsair".

Many Americans believed that Lord Byron's poem "The Corsair" was based on the life of the privateer/pirate Jean Lafitte.

French painter Eugène Delacroix depicted a scene from the work in a watercolor entitled, Episode from The Corsair (1831). It shows Gulnare visiting the imprisoned pirate Conrad in his cell. Henry Fuseli did a sketch in 1815 entitled "Conrad Rescues Gulnare" based on The Corsair. Henry Singleton and Richard Corbould also produced paintings based on the work.

In 1840, American editor and author N. P. Willis named his new periodical The Corsair after Byron's poem.

Summary
The plot is based on the main character Conrad, "the Corsair", who is a  pirate or privateer. The first canto recounts Conrad's plan to attack the  Pacha Seyd and to seize his possessions. Conrad's wife, Medora, however, is determined to convince him to abandon his plan and not to embark on the mission. He sails from his island in the Aegean Sea to attack the pasha on another island.

The second canto describes the attack. Disguised, Conrad and his brigands begin their assault against Pacha Seyd. The attack goes well and according to plan. But Conrad hears the cries of the women in the pasha's harem, whom he tries to free. This diversion enables the pasha's forces to mount a counterattack. They kill most of the attackers and seize Conrad. Gulnare, the pasha's slave, secretly goes to Conrad's prison cell, where she tells him that she will try to save him. This is in gratitude for his attempt to save her.

In the third and final canto, Gulnare initiates the escape plan by trying to trick Seyd into freeing Conrad. When this fails, the pasha threatens to kill both her and Conrad. Gulnare tries to convince Conrad to kill Seyd, and arranges for a knife to be taken to his cell. Conrad refuses to kill the pasha in cold blood without a fair fight. 

She kills the pasha herself. Gulnare and Conrad escape, and he takes her back to his island. Upon his return, Conrad learns that his wife Medora has died from grief, believing that Conrad himself had died. In the final scene, Conrad departs from the island alone, without Gulnare: "He left a Corsair's name to other times,/Linked with one virtue and a thousand crimes."

References

Sources
 Drucker, Peter. 'Byron and Ottoman love: Orientalism, Europeanization and same sex sexualities in the early nineteenth-century Levant' (Journal of European Studies, vol. 42 no. 2, June 2012, 140–57).
 Garrett, Martin: George Gordon, Lord Byron. (British Library Writers' Lives). London: British Library, 2000. .
 Garrett, Martin. Palgrave Literary Dictionary of Byron. Palgrave, 2010. .
 Guiccioli, Teresa, contessa di, Lord Byron's Life in Italy, transl. Michael Rees, ed. Peter Cochran, 2005, .
 Grosskurth, Phyllis: Byron: The Flawed Angel. Hodder, 1997. .
 McGann, Jerome: Byron and Romanticism. Cambridge: Cambridge University Press, 2002. .
 Oueijan, Naji B. A Compendium of Eastern Elements in Byron's Oriental Tales. New York: Peter Lang Publishing, 1999.
 Ramsay, Jack C. (1996), Jean Laffite: Prince of Pirates, Eakin Press, 
 Rosen, Fred: Bentham, Byron and Greece. Clarendon Press, Oxford, 1992. .

External links

NPR: "'The Corsair,' Lord Byron's Best-Seller".
The Corsair by Lord Byron, 1814, seventh edition.
 

1814 books
Poetry by Lord Byron
Romanticism
1810s works
1814 poems